Ricardo Michael Nanita (born June 12, 1981) is a Dominican former professional baseball outfielder. He played for the Chunichi Dragons of Nippon Professional Baseball (NPB), and for the Dominican Republic national baseball team.

Amateur career
Nanita attended Chipola College, and then transferred to Florida International University (FIU), where he played college baseball for the FIU Panthers baseball team.

Professional career

Chicago White Sox
The Chicago White Sox drafted Nanita in the 14th round of the 2003 Major League Baseball draft.

Nanita spent his first season in the minors with White Sox affiliate Great Falls in the Pioneer League registering a .384 batting average with 37 RBIs in 212 plate appearances.

Toronto Blue Jays
Nanita played for the Toronto Blue Jays Triple-A affiliate Las Vegas 51s in the 2011 and 2012 seasons. The Blue Jays invited him to spring training in 2013.

Nanita played for the Dominican Republic national baseball team in the 2013 World Baseball Classic.

Nanita started the 2013 season with the Double-A New Hampshire Fisher Cats.  He was promoted to the Triple-A Buffalo Bisons on May 21.

On January 20, 2014, the Blue Jays announced that Nanita had been signed to a minor league contract for 2014 with an invitation to major league spring training. He was assigned to the Triple-A Buffalo Bisons before the end of spring training. Nanita was transferred to the temporarily inactive list on May 11, 2014, after he opened the season batting .118 over 6 games. On May 17, it was announced that Nanita had been loaned to the Tigres de Quintana Roo of the Mexican Baseball League.

Chunichi Dragons
Nanita was signed by the Chunichi Dragons of Nippon Professional Baseball on December 15, 2014.

On October 29, 2016, it was confirmed that Nanita would be released from the Dragons along with Leyson Séptimo, Juan Jaime, Drew Naylor, and Anderson Hernández.

Guerreros de Oaxaca
On March 14, 2018, Nanita signed with the Guerreros de Oaxaca of the Mexican League. He was released on March 30, 2018.

References

External links

Nanita's Twitter

1981 births
Living people
Birmingham Barons players
Buffalo Bisons (minor league) players
Central American and Caribbean Games gold medalists for the Dominican Republic
Central American and Caribbean Games medalists in baseball
Chipola Indians baseball players
Chunichi Dragons players
Competitors at the 2010 Central American and Caribbean Games
Dominican Republic expatriate baseball players in Japan
Dominican Republic expatriate baseball players in Mexico
Dominican Republic expatriate baseball players in the United States
Dominican Republic people of French descent
FIU Panthers baseball players
Great Falls White Sox players
Guerreros de Oaxaca players
Gulf Coast Nationals players
Harrisburg Senators players
Kannapolis Intimidators players
Las Vegas 51s players
Mexican League baseball outfielders
New Hampshire Fisher Cats players
Nippon Professional Baseball outfielders
Olmecas de Tabasco players
Rojos del Águila de Veracruz players
Sportspeople from Santo Domingo
Sultanes de Monterrey players
Winston-Salem Warthogs players
World Baseball Classic players of the Dominican Republic
2013 World Baseball Classic players